Stizhkivske is an urban-type settlement in Shakhtarsk Municipality, Horlivka Raion in Donetsk Oblast of eastern Ukraine. Population:

Demographics
Native language as of the Ukrainian Census of 2001:
 Ukrainian 31.67%
 Russian 67.39%
 Belarusian 0.34%
 Armenian 0.11%
 Greek 0.02%

References

Urban-type settlements in Horlivka Raion